The Kavrayskiy Hills are a line of mostly ice-covered coastal hills in Antarctica, rising south of Rennick Bay and along the west side of the lower end of Rennick Glacier. They were charted by the Soviet Antarctic Expedition (1958) and named after Vladimir V. Kavrayskiy, a Soviet geodesist and cartographer.

See also
Thompson Point (Antarctica)

References

Hills of Victoria Land
Pennell Coast